Vejle Boldklub Kolding (Vejle Kolding or VB Kolding) was a short lived professional Danish football club. The club played two seasons in the Danish 1st Division before being dissolved in 2013.

The club was founded in June 2011, when Vejle Boldklub and Kolding FC merged.

The club was dissolved in June 2013 and split into Vejle Boldklub and Kolding IF.

External links
 Official site

Vejle Kolding
Association football clubs established in 2011
Vejle Municipality
2011 establishments in Denmark
Vejle Boldklub
Kolding IF